Wú is the pinyin transliteration of the Chinese surname 吳 (Simplified Chinese 吴), which is a common surname (family name) in Mainland China. Wú (吳) is the sixth name listed in the Song Dynasty classic Hundred Family Surnames. In 2019 Wu was the ninth most common surname in Mainland China. A 2013 study found that it was the eighth most common surname, shared by 26,800,000 people or 2.000% of the population, with the province having the most being Guangdong.

The Cantonese and Hakka transliteration of 吳 is Ng, a syllable made entirely of a nasal consonant while the Min Nan transliteration of 吳 is Ngo, Ngoh, Ngov, Goh, Go, Gouw, depending on the regional variations in Min Nan pronunciation. Shanghainese transliteration of 吳 is Woo.

吳 is also one of the most common surnames in Korea. It is spelled 오 in Hangul and romanized O by the three major romanization systems, but more commonly spelled Oh in South Korea. 
It is also related far back in Chinese history with the name "Zhou (周)" and "Ji (姬)". The Vietnamese equivalent of the surname is Ngô.

Several other, less common Chinese surnames  are also transliterated into English as "Wu", but with different tones: 
武 Wǔ, 
伍 Wǔ, 
仵 Wǔ, 
烏  Wū (also Wù), 
鄔 Wū
and 巫 Wū.  
 
Wu (or Woo or Wou) is also the Cantonese transliteration of the  Chinese surname 胡 (Mandarin Hu), used in Hong Kong, and by overseas Chinese of Cantonese-speaking areas of Guangdong, Guangxi, and/or Hong Kong/Macau origin.

History of the surname Wu (吳)
The name originates from the ancient state of Wu in present-day province of Jiangsu.

In the 13th century BC, the state of Zhou (which will later become the Zhou Dynasty) was ruled by Tai Wang (King Tai of Zhou).  His surname was originally Ji (姬).  He had three sons: Taibo, Zhongyong, and Jili.  King Tai of Zhou favored the youngest son, Jili to inherit the reins of power, therefore Taibo and his brother Zhongyong voluntarily left Zhou with a group of followers and headed southeast where they established the state of Wu.  Taibo and Zhongyong's descendants eventually adopted Wu (吳) as their surname.  The state of Wu later became a powerful kingdom of its own with the help of Generals Wu Zixu and Sun Tzu, the latter best known as the author of the military treatise The Art of War, both serving under King Helü of Wu.  King Helü is considered to be one of the Five Hegemons of China during the Spring and Autumn period.

Taibo and Zhongyong's youngest brother Jili stayed to rule the Zhou state and was the grandfather of Wu Wang (King Wu of Zhou) who started the Zhou Dynasty after successfully overthrowing the Shang Dynasty.  The descendants of Wu Wang eventually changed their surname from Ji (姬) to Zhou (周) during the Qin Dynasty to commemorate the merits and virtues of their ancestors.

Therefore, the surnames Wu (吳), Zhou (周), and Ji (姬) are historically related.

Notable people
(in alphabetical order according to their names as spelled in Pinyin, or if unavailable, in English)

Historical figures

姬 吳泰伯 – Taibo of Wu, eldest son of King Tai of Zhou and the legendary founder of the State of Wu, and the propagator of all people with the surname Wu (吳).  Ancestral name is Ji (姬).
吳起 (吴起) – Wu Qi, famous Chu general who wrote the Wuzi
吳漢 (吴汉) – Wu Han (Han dynasty), military general of Eastern Han
吳景 (吴景) – Wu Jing (Han dynasty), military general under Warlord Sun Jian
吳瑞 – Wu Rui (eunuch), Chinese eunuch in Lê Dynasty Annam (Vietnam)
吳三桂 (吴三桂) – Wu Sangui (1612–1678), Ming Dynasty general
吳梅 (吴梅) – Ng Mui (Wu Méi), one of the legendary Five Elders of the Shaolin Temple
吳懿 (吴懿) – Wu Yi (Three Kingdoms), general of Shu Han
吴藻 – Wu Zao (1799–1862), Chinese poet

Modern figures
吳廷琰- Ngô Đình Diệm (Wú Tíngyǎn), First president of South Vietnam (1955-1963)
 Wu Chen-huan, Political Deputy Minister of Justice of the Republic of China (2012–2015)
 Wu Chien-Shiung, Chinese-American experimental physicist (1912-1997)
 Wu Chih-chung, Deputy Minister of Foreign Affairs of the Republic of China (2016–2018)
 Wu Ching-ji, Deputy Mayor of Taipei (2006–2009)
 Wu Den-yih, chairperson of Kuomintang
 Wu Hong-mo, Minister of Transportation and Communications of the Republic of China (2018)
 Wu Hsin-hsing, Minister of Overseas Community Affairs Council of the Republic of China
 Wu Mei-hung, Political Deputy Minister of Mainland Affairs Council of the Republic of China (2013–2015)
 Wu Ming-ji, Deputy Minister of Council for Economic Planning and Development of the Republic of China (2012–2013)
 Wu Rong-i, Vice Premier of the Republic of China (2005–2006)
 Wu Se-hwa, Minister of Education (2014–2016)
 Wu Shiow-ming, Chairperson of Fair Trade Commission of the Republic of China (2009–2017)
 Wu Tang-chieh, Political Deputy Minister of Finance of the Republic of China (2013–2016)
 Wu Tieh-cheng, Vice Premier of the Republic of China (1948–1949)
 Wu Tsung-tsong, Minister of National Science Council of the Republic of China (2006–2008)
 Wu Tze-cheng, Governor of Taiwan Province (2017–2018)
 Wu Tzu-hsin, Administrative Deputy Minister of Finance of the Republic of China
 Wu Ying-yih, Minister of Overseas Community Affairs Council of the Republic of China (2008–2013)
 Wu Yuhong (born 1966), Chinese badminton player
吳恬敏 – Constance Wu, American actress
Harry Wu (1937–2016), human rights activist
吴倩 – Wu Qian (actress), Chinese actress
Adrienne Wu (born 1990), Canadian fashion designer
Brianna Wu, American video game developer and commentator 
Billy Goh
吳辰君 (吴辰君) – Annie Wu (actress), Taiwanese actress
吳庚霖 – Wu Geng Lin, birth name of Aaron Yan 炎亞綸, actor and singer in Taiwanese band Fahrenheit
吳清源 (吳清源) –  Wú Qīngyuán (Go Seigen), Chinese-born Japanese Go player
Frank Wu, American artist and husband of Brianna Wu
伦纳德·吴 – Leonard Wu, American actor
吳百福 (吴百福) – Go Pek-Hok (Momofuku Ando) (1910–2007), Taiwanese-born Japanese inventor of instant noodles
吳邦國 (吴邦国) – Wu Bangguo, Chairman of the Politburo Standing Committee of the Communist Party of China
吳尊 – Wu Chun, Brunei-born actor and singer in Taiwanese band Fahrenheit
吳健雄 (吴健雄) – Wu Chien-Shiung, Chinese scientist
吳彥祖 (吴彦祖) – Wu, Daniel, American actor
吳凱文 (吴凯文) – Wu, Kevin, American internet personality
吳振偉 (吴振伟) – Wu, David, congressman from the 1st district of Oregon
吴虹霓 – Wu, Hongni (born 1994), Chinese mezzo-soprano opera singer
吳憲 (吴宪) – Wu, Hsien (1893–1959), an early protein scientist
吳季剛 (吴季刚) – Jason Wu, Taiwanese Canadian fashion designer
吳迪 -Di Wu (pianist), American-Chinese concert pianist
吳鑑泉 (吴鉴泉) – Wu Jianquan (1870–1942), Taijiquan teacher
吴立红 – Wu Lihong, environmental activist
吴乐宝 – Wu Lebao, Chinese cyber-dissident
吳蠻 (吴蛮) – Wu Man, pipa and ruan player
吳弭 - Michelle Wu (born 1985), mayor of Boston (2021–)
 – Wu Qingrui (Goh Keng Swee, 1918–2010), former Deputy Prime Minister of Singapore
 – Wu Ruisi (Goh, Theresa Rui Si), Singaporean Paralympic swimmer
吳詩聰 – Shin-Tson Wu (born 1953), American physicist and professor
Wu Shoei-yun
吴水娇 – Wu Shuijiao (born 1992), Chinese track and field hurdler
吳天明 (吴天明) – Wu Tianming, Chinese film director
吳文俊  – Wu Wenjun (1919–2017), Chinese mathematician
吳儀 (吴仪) – Wu Yi (politician), vice-premier of the People's Republic of China
呉子良 – Wu Ziliang, the birthname of Emi Suzuki, Japanese model of Chinese descent
吳作棟 (吴作栋) – Wu Zuodong (Goh Chok Tong), former Prime Minister of the Republic of Singapore, current Senior Minister of Singapore and the chairman of the Central Bank of Singapore
 吴亦凡 – Kris Wu, ex-member of the Chinese-South Korean boy group EXO, Chinese actor and Singer-songwriter 
 吴宣仪 – Wu Xuanyi, member of South Korean–Chinese girl group Cosmic Girls, contestant on Produce 101 China, and member of Chinese girl group Rocket Girls 101
 Frank Wu (artist), science-fiction artist
 吳奇隆 – Wu Qilong (Nicky Wu), Chinese actor/singer
 吴映洁 – Wu Ying Chieh (Gui Gui), Taiwanese mandopop singer and actress
吳天恩 – Andrew Gotianun (1927–2016), Chinese Filipino businessman
吳奕輝 – John Gokongwei (1926-2019), Chinese Filipino businessman
 吴非 – Wu Fei, Beijing composer and guzheng performer and improviser
Wendy Wu: Homecoming Warrior, 2006 movie
Wendy Wu, performer with The Photos
 William F. Wu – American science-fiction writer
 吳漢潤 – Haing S. Ngor, doctor, actor and author
 吳耀漢 – Richard Woo, Hong Kong actor
 吳宇森 – John Woo, Hong Kong director
 呉由姫 – Yuki Kure, manga artist
 吳光正 Peter Woo Hong Kong business magnate
 吴军 Wu Jun (victim), Chinese survivor and victim of a robbery-murder case. His friend Cao Ruyin was murdered; their two attackers were separately sentenced to death and to 18.5 years' jail for murder and robbery with hurt respectively.
 吳漢章 - James Hong, Chinese American actor
 吳青峰 - Wu Qing-feng (Wu Tsing-Fong), Taiwanese singer and vocalist for Sodagreen band

Other surnames
Wū
It is the 78th name on the Hundred Family Surnames poem.

 – Wu Junmei (Vivian Wu), Chinese actress

Wū
 – Wu Guoqing, police detective and forensic scientist

Wū

巫 wū ("shaman") rarely occurs as a surname although it's more commonly associated with Malaysians of Chinese descent, or Chinese people that share connections with Malaysia. It is generally related to the Chinese compound surname Wuma 巫馬 (lit. "horse shaman; equine veterinary"), but can also be regarded as a shortened term for 巫来由/巫來由 (wūláiyóu), a transcription of Malay Melayu''.

Eric Moo 巫啟賢 - Malaysian Chinese singer
Boo Tiang Huat 巫镇发 - Singaporean Chinese policeman

References

Chinese-language surnames
Multiple Chinese surnames

ru:У (фамилия)
vi:Ngô (họ)